Lin Yang-kang (10 June 1927 – 13 April 2013) was a Taiwanese politician. He was born at Sun Moon Lake during the Japanese rule of Taiwan.  Some thought he might be Chiang Ching-kuo's successor as head of the Kuomintang (KMT), but after failing to win the KMT's nomination for president in 1996, he became an independent. Lin rejoined the party in 2005, and died in 2013.

Biography
Lin was born in Niitaka District, Taichū Prefecture (modern-day Nantou County) Taiwan and graduated from National Taiwan University with a bachelor of science degree.

Lin was married to Chen Ho (陳閤) and had one son and three daughters.

On 13 April 2013, Lin died at home in Taichung, of intestinal obstruction and organ failure, aged 85.

Political career
Lin began his political career in the 1960s. By 1990, he was a vice-chairman of the Kuomintang. Aligned with the "non-mainstream faction" that aimed to be less confrontational with the People's Republic of China than Lee Teng-hui, Lin tried to replace Lee in the 1990 presidential election, with Chiang Wei-kuo as his running mate.
 
He resigned his position as the head of the Judicial Yuan on 1 September 1994 to become a presidential advisor to Lee Teng-hui. Upon taking the appointment, Lin again declared his candidacy for Taiwan's first direct presidential elections, scheduled for 1996. However, he was not chosen as the Kuomintang nominee. Lin and Chen Li-an resisted calls to join forces and run as the New Party ticket, choosing instead to run separately as independents. After considering Chang Feng-hsu as a running mate, Lin eventually chose former premier Hau Pei-tsun, believing that Hau's background might attract more mainlanders' votes for him. However, Lin's pro-China and pro-reunification views during the Third Taiwan Strait Crisis caused many Taishang to vote against him, and the Lin–Hau ticket finished third with 14.9% of the vote. Chen ran with Wang Ching-feng. Both Chen and Lin were later expelled from the Kuomintang. He retired from political affairs and secluded himself in Taichung after this defeat. Lin resumed membership in the KMT in 2005.

References 

1927 births
2013 deaths
Mayors of Taipei
Kuomintang politicians in Taiwan
National Taiwan University alumni
Magistrates of Nantou County
Taiwanese Ministers of the Interior
Taiwanese Presidents of the Judicial Yuan
Taiwanese people of Hoklo descent
Senior Advisors to President Lee Teng-hui
Chairpersons of the Taiwan Provincial Government
Independent presidential candidates of Taiwan
Expelled members of the Kuomintang